John Joseph Nichols is a United States Air Force major general who served as the director of operations of the United States Strategic Command. He previously served as director of global power programs at the Office of the Assistant Secretary for Acquisition, Technology, and Logistics. He also commanded the 509th Bomb Wing.

Military career

In July 2022, Nichols was reassigned as director of operations of the United States Strategic Command.

References

Living people
Place of birth missing (living people)
Recipients of the Legion of Merit
United States Air Force generals
United States Air Force personnel of the Iraq War
Year of birth missing (living people)